Wayoró (also Wayoro, Ajurú, Wajuru; Wayoró: wayoro emẽto ) is a moribund Tuparian language (Tupian family), which is spoken in the state of Rondônia, in the Amazon region of Brazil. As of 2019, there were reported to be 3 speakers (all above 70 years old) and 11 semispeakers out of the ethnic population of approximately 250.

Dialects
The Wajuru people is subdivided into three subgroups: the Ngwayoroiat (‘those from the Stone’), the Ngwãkũyãian (‘the Agouti ones’), and the Kupndiiriat (‘the Forest ones’). Some lexical and phonological differences have been reported between the varieties spoken by the Ngwayoroiat (Wayoroiat) and by the Kupndiiriat.

Phonology

Consonants
The consonantal inventory of Wayoró is as follows. The graphemes which correspond to each phoneme are given in chevrons.

Underlying nasal consonants may be partially or fully oralized in oral environments. Nogueira (2019) describes the following allophones:
 /m/ → [m] ‹m›, [mb] ‹mb›
 /n/ → [n] ‹n›, [nd] ‹nd›
 /ɲ/ → [ɲ, j, j̃, jt] ‹y›, [ndʒ, dʒ] ‹dj›
 /ŋ/ → [ŋ, ŋg] ‹ng›, [g] ‹g›
 /ŋʷ/ → [ŋʷ, ŋgʷ] ‹ngw›, [gʷ] ‹gw›

The phonological status of the glottal stop [ʔ], which occurs in the onset position only (e.g. o’uwa [oʔʉβa] ‘my pot’, o’ega [oʔɛga] ‘my hiccup’, apa’a [apaʔa] ‘to weave a hammock horizontally’), is given as uncertain by Nogueira (2019).

Vowels
The vowel inventory of Wayoró is as follows.

Syntax
As in other Tuparian languages, the main clauses of Wayoró follow the cross-linguistically rare nominative–absolutive pattern. Person prefixes on the verb are absolutive, i.e., they index the sole argument of an intransitive verb (S) and the patient argument ('direct object') of a transitive verb (P). Person pronouns, which follow the verb (either cliticizing to it or not) are nominative: they may encode the sole argument of an intransitive verb (S) or the agent argument of a transitive verb (A), but not the patient of a transitive verb (P). This is exemplified below.

References

External links 
 ELAR archive of Documentation of Urgently Endangered Tupian Languages (including Ajuru)
 TuLaR (Tupian Languages Resources)

Tupian languages
Languages of South America
Mamoré–Guaporé linguistic area